Tulosesus pellucidus is a species of mushroom producing fungus in the family Psathyrellaceae.

Taxonomy 
It was first described as Coprinus pelliculus by the Finnish mycologist Petter Adolf Karsten in 1882.

In 2001 a phylogenetic study resulted in a major reorganization and reshuffling of that genus and this species was transferred to Coprinellus.

The species was known as Coprinellus pelliculus until 2020 when the German mycologists Dieter Wächter & Andreas Melzer reclassified many species in the Psathyrellaceae family based on phylogenetic analysis.

References

pellucidus
Fungi described in 1882
Taxa named by Petter Adolf Karsten
Tulosesus